John Griffith (1591 – 10 August 1642) was a Welsh politician who sat in the House of Commons at various times between 1621 and 1642.

Griffith was the son of John Griffith (of Cefnamlwch), Llyn. He matriculated at Brasenose College, Oxford aged 15 on 31 October 1606 and became a member of Lincoln's Inn in 1609.

In 1618 he was appointed High Sheriff of Caernarvonshire. 
He was elected Member of Parliament for Carnarvonshire in 1621. He became Constable of Carnarvon Castle on 18 July 1622. In 1626 he was re-elected MP for Carnarvonshire. He  became Vice Admiral of North Wales in September 1626. In 1628 he was re-elected MP for Carnarvonshire and sat until 1629 when King Charles decided to rule without parliament for eleven years.
 
In November 1640, Griffith was elected MP for Beaumaris in the Long Parliament and sat until his death in 1642. 
 
Griffith died at the age of 51.

Griffith married May Trevor, daughter of Sir Richard Trevor of Trevalyn. His son John was also MP for Carnarvonshire in the Long Parliament.

References

 

 

1591 births
1642 deaths
Members of the Parliament of England (pre-1707) for constituencies in Wales
High Sheriffs of Caernarvonshire
Alumni of Brasenose College, Oxford
Members of Lincoln's Inn
English MPs 1621–1622
English MPs 1626
English MPs 1628–1629
English MPs 1640–1648
Members of the Parliament of England for Beaumaris